Horacio Franco (born 11 October 1963) is a Mexican flautist and recorder player. He studied at the National Conservatory in Mexico City and later at the Sweelinck Conservatorium in Amsterdam, with Marijke Miessen and Walter van Hauwe. Franco has performed many genres of music, from medieval, Renaissance, and Baroque music—including Latin American colonial music—to contemporary, folkloric, and popular styles.

Recordings 
  Hotteterre Trio, 1987, Luzam Discs
  Solistas of Mexico director Eduardo Bush, 1988
  Mexican Music for recorder, 1991, Cenidim-Quindecim recordings
  The Folias Hotteterre Trio, 1992, Peer to them discs
  Cappella Cervantina Horacio Franco director, 1994, Quindecim Recordings
  Vivaldi Concerti per Flauto Horacio Franco and Capella Cervantina, 1994, Quindecim Recordings
  Contemporary Music of Camera vol.6 Jorge Cordova, 1994, Bartok Study
  Concerto For Recorder and Orchestra Kibbutzim Chamber Orchestra Mordechai Rechtmann- conductor Michael recorded Wolpe-composer live, 1995, Production of the Composer
  Mexican Symphonic Music Concert for Recorder and Orchestra of Marcela Rodriguez OFUNAM director Ronald Zollman, 1995, Digital Urtext Classics
  Il Gardellino Horacio Franco and the Camerana Aguascalientes, 1996, Quindecim Recordings
 Musica Barroca Mexicana Cappella Cervantina Horacio Franco director, 1996, Quindecim Recordings
 The Art of Horacio Franco Horacio Franco & the Georgian Chamber Orchestra directed by Horacio Franco, 1997, Guild Recordings
 Carlos Monsiváis and Horacio Franco, 1997, alive Voice of Mexico UNAM
 Musica Barroca Mexicana Vol. 2. Cappella Cervantina-Horacio Franco director, 1998, Discs K 617-France distributed in Mexico by Quindecim Recordings
 From the Medieval to the Danzón Horacio Franco and Victor Flores, 2002, Quindecim Recordings
 Solo Bach Horacio Franco, 2004, Quindecim Recordings
 Sones de Tierra and Nube with the Band Filarmónica Mixe of the CECAM of Sta. Maria de Tlahuitoltepec, 2005, Xquenda Discs
 Capella Puebla director and solista Horacio Franco, 2005, Quindecim recordings
 From Bach, the Beatles and others more Horacio Franco and Victor Flores, 2005, Quindecim Recordings

Personal life
Franco is openly a part of the LGBT community, and in 2011 he married Arturo Plancarte, who is his current manager. In March 2020, Franco announced that he had tested positive for COVID-19 amidst the coronavirus pandemic.

References

1963 births
Conservatorium van Amsterdam alumni
Mexican gay musicians
Living people
Mexican classical flautists
20th-century Mexican LGBT people
21st-century Mexican LGBT people